Guss is an unincorporated community in Nodaway Township, Taylor County, Iowa, United States.

History
Founded in the 1800s, Guss' population was 25 in 1902.

References

Unincorporated communities in Taylor County, Iowa
Unincorporated communities in Iowa